Onyeka Azike (born July 1, 1990) is a Nigerian weightlifter. She competed in the 2006 Commonwealth Games, won a silver medal in the women's 53 kg division at the 2006 Commonwealth Games in Melbourne, Australia, and won a gold medal in the 58 kg weightlifting category of the 2007 All Africa Games in Algeria.

Career 
Onyeka Azike first started her weightlifting career at the 2006 Commonwealth Games and won a silver medal in the women's 53 kg division at the 2006 Commonwealth Games in Melbourne, Australia. She then chose to participate in the 2010 World Weightlifting Championships and the Commonwealth Games Women's 48 – 53 kg category, winning a silver medal. When interviewed by a reporter, Azike urged more women to develop their talents in the sport, saying most young girls that are interested in weightlifting nurse the fear that they might not be able to have children. She also stated that a large number of female weightlifters are now mothers and have won laurels for their states and the nation at various national and international competitions.

Competitions

African Games 2015 

 Women's 53–58 kg—Clean and jerk 1st
 Women's 53–58 kg—Snatch 1st
 Women's 53–58 kg—Total Gold

World Championships 2011 

 Women's 53–58 kg—Clean & Jerk 22
 Women's 53–58 kg—Snatch 23
 World Championships Women's 53–58 kg—Total 23

Commonwealth Games 2010 

 Women's 48–53 kg 2
 Women's 53–58 kg—Silver
 Women's 53–58 kg—Total Silver

World Championships 2007 

 Women's - 48 kg—Clean & Jerk 25
 Women's - 48 kg—Snatch 26
 Women's - 48 kg—Total 26

References 

1992 births
Living people
Nigerian female weightlifters
Commonwealth Games silver medallists for Nigeria
Weightlifters at the 2014 Commonwealth Games
Commonwealth Games medallists in weightlifting
Weightlifters at the 2010 Commonwealth Games
African Games medalists in weightlifting
20th-century Nigerian women
21st-century Nigerian women
African Games gold medalists for Nigeria
African Games silver medalists for Nigeria
Competitors at the 2015 African Games
Medallists at the 2010 Commonwealth Games